Greenbury Lafayette Fort (October 17, 1825 – January 13, 1883) was a U.S. Representative from Illinois.

Biography
Born in French Grant, Ohio, Fort moved with his parents to Marshall County, Illinois, in April 1834. He completed preparatory studies and attended Rock River Seminary.
He studied law. He was admitted to the bar in 1847 and commenced practice in Lacon, Illinois. Fort was elected sheriff in 1850. He served as clerk of Marshall County in 1852, and was a county judge in 1857.

He was appointed a second lieutenant in the Eleventh Regiment, Illinois Volunteer Infantry, on April 30, 1861. He was promoted through the ranks to lieutenant colonel and quartermaster. He was brevetted major and lieutenant colonel of Volunteers on March 13, 1865.

He served as member of the Illinois State Senate in 1866.

Fort was elected as a Republican to the Forty-third and to the three succeeding Congresses (March 4, 1873 – March 3, 1881). He was not a candidate for renomination in 1880. He retired from public life. He died in Lacon, Illinois, January 13, 1883. He was interred in Lacon Cemetery. He married Clara Boal, the daughter of Robert Boal, and was the father of state senator Robert Boal Fort.

References

1825 births
1883 deaths
Illinois sheriffs
Illinois lawyers
People from Scioto County, Ohio
People from Lacon, Illinois
People of Illinois in the American Civil War
Union Army officers
Republican Party members of the United States House of Representatives from Illinois
Illinois state court judges
Republican Party Illinois state senators
19th-century American politicians
19th-century American judges
19th-century American lawyers